Petacci is a surname. Notable people with the surname include:

Clara Petacci (1912–1945), mistress of Benito Mussolini
Emilio Petacci (1886–1965), Italian film actor
Marcello Petacci (1910–1945), Italian surgeon and businessman
Myriam Petacci (1923–1991), Italian actress, known as Miriam di San Servolo

Italian-language surnames